The following is a list of schools in Central Province, Sri Lanka.

Kandy District

National schools

Provincial schools

Private Schools

International schools

Special Schools

Matale District

National schools

Provincial schools

Semi-government Schools

Private Schools

International Schools

Special Schools

Nuwara Eliya District

National schools

Provincial schools

Private schools

International Schools

References 

 
Central Province